Turmoil is a platform game released in 1984 for the ZX Spectrum, and in 1986 for the MSX by Bug Byte. The player takes control of Mechanic Mick who has been employed by a rich Arabian Sheikh.  The Sheikh has refused to pay Mick for work done, so Mick decides to steal his collection of expensive cars in lieu of payment.  He must build the cars by collecting oil from a dripping oil tank.  The oil can also be used as an offensive weapon against the pursuing Arabian guards.

Gameplay 

The playing area consists of a number of platforms, ladders, conveyor belts and swinging ropes which Mick must negotiate.  First he must collect an oil can, which he must take to a tap which is dripping oil.  The oil that has been collected must be taken to the garage.  Once there Mick can empty his can, a drop at a time, to fill his car.  The car is invisible initially, and is built up as each drop of oil is deposited. On the first level the car is a Mini, but as on subsequent levels the cars become more sleek and expensive.

Also present on each level are a number of enemies (resembling Arabs) who will attack Mick and cause him to lose a life.  Unlike other platform games, the main character cannot jump by himself, but must fall onto one of the springs which are present on each level to bounce to a different platform.  The Arabs will also make use of the ladders, ropes and springs.

Reception 
Reviews were overwhelmingly positive. CRASH gave the game 90% (a "CRASH Smash"), while Your Spectrum called it a "Hit" with 3.5/5. Dave Nicholls of Your Spectrum, that "The springs are a great idea.", and CRASH called it a "slick, well executed program".

References

External links 

http://www.generation-msx.nl/msxdb/softwareinfo/2682

Platform games
1984 video games
ZX Spectrum games
MSX games
Video games developed in the United Kingdom
Bug-Byte Software games
Single-player video games